Usora is a river in central-northern Bosnia and Herzegovina. It begins at the confluence of two smaller Usora rivers, Mala Usora and Velika Usora, at the town of Teslić. Usora runs for some 20 km northeast of Teslić, and becomes a left tributary of the Bosna River, south of Doboj.

References

External links

Rivers of Bosnia and Herzegovina
Zenica-Doboj Canton
Teslić